Arthur John Veysey (6 February 1881–1930) was an English footballer who played in the Football League for Wolverhampton Wanderers.

References

1881 births
1930 deaths
English footballers
Association football forwards
English Football League players
Bristol Rovers F.C. players
Wolverhampton Wanderers F.C. players